The Aligide River is a watercourse in Eritrea. It has its source a short distance outside of the national capital, Asmara. The river flows down the Eastern Escarpment of Eritrea until the small town of Foro near the Red Sea coast. At this point, the Aligide merges with two other rivers, the Comaile River and the Haddas River. It continues from there until it empties into the Red Sea.

See also
List of rivers of Eritrea

References

Rivers of Eritrea